Podegrodzie may refer to the following places:
Podegrodzie, Lesser Poland Voivodeship (south Poland)
Podegrodzie, Pomeranian Voivodeship (north Poland)
Podegrodzie, West Pomeranian Voivodeship (north-west Poland)